Matvey Dukso (born 8 April 2003) is a Belarusian professional footballer who plays for Smorgon.

His father Vladislav Dukso is a former professional footballer who spent his entire career playing for Smorgon.

References

External links 
 
 

2003 births
Living people
People from Smarhon’
Sportspeople from Grodno Region
Belarusian footballers
Association football midfielders
FC Smorgon players